James Sandilands, 2nd Lord Abercrombie (1645–1681), a member of the Parliament of Scotland, was the son of James Sandilands, 1st Lord Abercrombie and Jean Lichtoun.

His father's wasteful spending had resulted in the alienation of the family lands in Fife in 1649, and Abercrombie seems to have spent most of his life in poverty. He died unmarried in Kinneff in 1681, and the lordship of parliament became extinct.

References
thePeerage.com

1645 births
1681 deaths
Lords of Parliament (pre-1707)
People associated with Aberdeenshire
17th-century Scottish politicians